Mboie Airport  is an airport serving the village of Mboie in Democratic Republic of the Congo, Africa.

See also

Transport in the Democratic Republic of the Congo
List of airports in the Democratic Republic of the Congo

References

External links
 OpenStreetMap - Mboie Airport
 OurAirports - Mboie
 FallingRain - Mboie
 HERE Maps - Mboie
 

Airports in Kasaï-Central